Priya Bathija is an Indian television actress who played Afreen Khan in Khwaish. Bathija also appeared as Ganga Walia in Kasamh Se, and in Basera.

She was most recently seen in &TV's Daayan in 2019.

Personal life 
Priya Bathija has been married to DJ Kawaljeet but the  couple filed for divorce in 2019.

Television

References

Actresses from Mumbai
Indian television actresses
Living people
1986 births
Actresses in Hindi television
21st-century Indian actresses

External links